Infopark or InfoPark may refer to one of the following IT-focused business parks in India:
 InfoPark, Kochi, located in the Kakkanad region of Kochi, Ernakulam district
 Infopark Cherthala, in Cherthala, Alappuzha district
 InfoPark Thrissur, in Koratty, Thrissur district